The following Māori words exist as loanwords in English. Many of them concern endemic New Zealand flora and fauna that were known prior to the arrival of Europeans in New Zealand. Other terms relate to Māori customs. All of these words are commonly encountered in New Zealand English, and several (such as kiwi) are widely used across other varieties of English, and in other languages.

The Māori alphabet includes both long and short vowels, which change the meaning of words. For most of the 20th century, these were not indicated by spelling, except sometimes as double vowels (paaua). Since the 1980s, the standard way to indicate long vowels is with a macron (pāua). Since about 2015, macrons have rapidly become standard usage for Māori loanwords in New Zealand English in media, law, government, and education. Recently some anglicised words have been replaced with spellings that better reflect the original Māori word (Whanganui for Wanganui, Remutaka for Rimutaka).

Flora and fauna
 
The accepted English common names of a number of species of animal and plant endemic to New Zealand are simply their Māori names or a close equivalent:

 huhu  a type of large beetle
 huia  a recently extinct bird, much prized traditionally by Māori for its feathers
 kākā  a native parrot
 kākāpō  a rare native bird
 kahikatea  a type of large tree
 katipō  a venomous native spider
 kauri  large conifer in the Araucariaceae
 kea  a parrot, the world's only alpine parrot
 kererū  the native wood pigeon
 kina  the sea-urchin, eaten as a delicacy
 kiwi  the bird, a New Zealander, or (but not in New Zealand English) kiwifruit
 kōkako  a rare type of bird
 kōwhai  a type of flowering tree
 kūmara  sweet potato
 mako  a shark, considered a magnificent fighting game fish
 mamaku  a type of large tree fern
 moa  extinct giant flightless bird
 pāua  abalone
 pōhutukawa  a type of flowering tree
 ponga (also spelt punga)  the silver fern, often used as a symbol for New Zealand
 pūkeko  a wading bird, the purple swamphen
 rātā  a type of flowering tree
 rimu  a tree, the red pine
 takahē  a rare wading bird
 Tarakihi  a common fish, though often mispronounced in English as ‘tera-kee’. 
 toheroa  a shellfish
 tōtara  an evergreen tree
 tuatara  rare lizard-like reptile, not closely related to any other living species
 tūī  the parsonbird
 weka  a flightless bird of the rail family
 wētā  a large native insect, similar to a cricket
 whekī  a type of tree fern

Placenames

Thousands of Māori placenames (with or without anglicisation) are now official in New Zealand. These include:

 Territorial authorities: Waikato, Manawatu, Tauranga, Taranaki, Otago
 Cities: Porirua, Rotorua, Tauranga, Timaru, Whanganui, Whangārei
 Tourist destinations: Aoraki / Mount Cook, Tongariro, Manapouri, Moeraki, Wakatipu, Te Anau, Waitomo

Many New Zealand rivers and lakes have Māori names; these names predominantly use the prefixes wai- (water) and roto- (lake) respectively. Examples include the Waikato, Waipa and Waimakariri rivers, and lakes Rotorua, Rotomahana and Rotoiti.

Some Treaty of Waitangi settlements have included placename changes.

A Māori name for New Zealand, Aotearoa, has gained some currency as a more acceptable alternative. It appears in the names of some political parties, e.g. Green Party of Aotearoa New Zealand and Communist Party of Aotearoa.

Other words and phrases

 aroha  love, sympathy, compassion
 arohanui  "lots of love", commonly as a valediction
 haere mai and haere ra welcome and goodbye (respectively)
 haka  traditional Māori dance, not always a war dance, often performed by New Zealand sports teams to 'challenge' opponents; see Haka of the All Blacks
 hāngi  (1) earth oven used to cook large quantities of food (2) the food cooked in the hāngi
 hapū clan or subtribe, part of an iwi
 hikoi  march or walk, especially a symbolic walk such as a protest march
 hongi  traditional Māori greeting featuring the pressing together of noses and sharing of breath
 hui  meeting, conference
 iwi  tribe
 kai  food
 kai moana  sea food
 kapa haka  a cultural festival or music and dance
 ka pai  very pleasant, good, fine
 karakia  sung prayer or welcome
 kaupapa  policy or principle, credo, methodology or theoretical foundation
 kāwanatanga  transliteration of the English word "governance," sometimes mistranslated as "sovereignty." See also: tino rangatiratanga and Differences in the Māori and English versions of the Treaty of Waitangi
 kia kaha  an expression of support, lit. be strong
 kia ora  a greeting, lit. be healthy
 koha  gift, present, offering, donation, contribution
 kōhanga reo  Māori language preschool (literally 'language nest')
 kōrero  to talk; to speak Māori; story
 koru  stylised fern frond pattern, used in art
 Kura Kaupapa Māori  Māori language school
 mahi  work, employment
 mahinga mātaitai  traditional seafood gathering place
 mana  regard in which someone is held; respect of their authority; reputation
 manaia  guardian spirit, often found in Māori artwork and carving
 Māoritanga Māori culture, traditions, and way of life, lit. Māoriness
 marae  meeting house, the communal or sacred place that serves religious and social purposes in Māori society
 Matariki  midwinter festival, the Māori new year, lit. the star cluster of the Pleiades
 mihi  lit. greet, acknowledge; sometimes used for internet board or forum message
 moko  facial tattoo
 mokopuna  descendants, young children. Lit. grandchildren
 Ngaire  woman's name, origin unknown
 pā  hill fort
 pakarū broken, not working; often rendered in New Zealand English as puckeroo or puckerooed
 Pākehā  New Zealander of non-Māori descent, usually European
 Papakāinga  land used as housing by a hapu or whanau group
 poi A dance art that originated in Māori culture and is now popular in object-manipulation communities
 pounamu  greenstone, jade, nephrite
 pōwhiri  ceremony of welcome
 puku  abdomen, tummy
 rāhui  a ban or prohibition
 rohe  homeland, tribal area
 tangata whenua  lit. "people of the land". The home tribe of a given marae or district; locals; by extension, Māori in the New Zealand context.
 taniwhamythical water monster
 taonga  treasure, especially cultural treasures. Māori usage: property, goods, possessions, effects, treasure, something prized. The term whare taonga ("treasure house") is used in the Māori names of museums
 tapu  sacred, taboo; to be avoided because of this; (a cognate of the Tongan tabu, origin of the English borrowing of taboo)
 te reo  the Māori language (literally, 'the language')
 tiki  stylised representation of a male human, found in Māori artwork and carving
 tino rangatiratanga  a political term, sometimes translated as "chieftainship," but most accurately rendered as "(complete) sovereign authority", a right promised to Māori in the Treaty of Waitangi
 tukutuku  traditional woven panels
 utu  revenge. Māori usage: revenge, cost, price, wage, fee, payment, salary, reciprocity
 wāhi tapu  sacred site
 wai  water (often found in the names of New Zealand rivers)
 waiata  singing, song
 waka  canoe, transport
 whakapapa genealogy, ancestry, heritage
 whānau extended family or community of related families
 whare  house, building

Word list

Many Māori words or phrases that describe Māori culture have become assimilated into English or are used as foreign words, particularly in New Zealand English, and might be used in general (non-Māori) contexts. Some of these are:

 Aotearoa: New Zealand. Popularly interpreted to mean 'land of the long white cloud', but the original derivation is uncertain
 aroha: Love, sympathy, affection 
 arohanui: "lots of love", commonly as a complimentary close
 haere mai: welcome
 haka: a chant and dance of challenge (not always a war dance), popularised by the All Blacks rugby union team, who perform a haka before the game in front of the opposition 
 hāngi: a method of cooking food in a pit; or the occasion at which food is cooked this way (compare the Hawaiian use of the word luau)
 hongi: traditional Māori greeting featuring the pressing together of noses
 hui: a meeting; increasingly being used by New Zealand media to describe business meetings relating to Māori affairs
 iwi: tribe, or people
 kai: food
 kapai: very pleasant; good, fine. From Māori 'ka pai'
 kaitiaki: guardianship of the environment
 kaupapa: agenda, policy or principle
 kia ora: hello, and indicating agreement with a speaker (literally 'be healthy')
 koha: donation, contribution
 kōhanga reo: Māori language preschool (literally 'language nest')
 kōrero: to talk; to speak Māori; story
 Kura Kaupapa Māori:  Māori language school 
 mana: influence, reputation — a combination of authority, integrity, power and prestige
 Māoritanga: Māori culture, traditions, and way of life. Lit. Māoriness.
 marae: ceremonial meeting area in front of the meeting house; or the entire complex surrounding this, including eating and sleeping areas
 Pākehā: Non-Maori New Zealanders, especially those with European ancestry
 piripiri: clinging seed, origin of New Zealand English 'biddy-bid'.
 pōwhiri: ceremony of welcome
 puku: belly, usually a big one
 rāhui: restriction of access 
 tāngata whenua: native people of a country or region, i.e. the Māori in New Zealand (literally 'people of the land')
 tapu: sacred, taboo; to be avoided because of this; (a cognate of the Tongan tabu, origin of the English borrowing of taboo)
 tangi: to mourn; or, a funeral at a marae
 taniwha: mythical water monster
 te reo: the Māori language (literally, 'the language')
 waka: canoe, boat (modern Māori usage includes automobiles)
 whānau: extended family or community of related families
 whare: house, building

Other Māori words and phrases may be recognised by most New Zealanders, but generally not used in everyday speech:

 hapū: subtribe; or, pregnant
 kapa haka: cultural gathering involving dance competitions; haka team
 karakia: prayer, used in various circumstances including opening ceremonies
 kaumātua: older person, respected elder
 kia kaha: literally 'be strong'; roughly "be of good heart, we are supporting you"
 Kīngitanga: Māori King Movement
 matangi: wind, breeze ("Matangi" is the name for a class of electric multiple unit trains used on the Wellington suburban network, so named after Wellington's windy reputation).
 mauri: spiritual life force
 mokopuna: literally grandchildren, but can mean any young children
 pakarū: broken, damaged
 rangatira: chief
 rohe: home territory of a specific iwi
 taihoa – not yet, wait a while
 tamariki: children
 tohunga: priest (in Māori use, an expert or highly skilled person)
 tūrangawaewae: one's own turf, "a place to stand"
 tutū: to be rebellious, stirred up, mischievous  Used in New Zealand English to mean "fidget" or "fiddle" e.g. "Don't tutū with that!"
 urupā: burial ground
 utu: revenge (in Māori, payment, response, answer)
 wāhi tapu: sacred site
 whaikōrero: oratory
 whakapapa: genealogy
 waiata: song
 wairua: spirit

See also

Māori influence on New Zealand English
List of English words of Polynesian origin
List of Māori plant common names

References

Further reading
Matthews, R. J. H. (1984). Maori Influence on New Zealand English. World Englishes 3 (3), 156–159. 

Māori words and phrases
Maori
New Zealand English